Adelaide Central bus station is Adelaide's main terminus for long distance coach services. It is located on Franklin Street.

History

Terminal 1 of the Adelaide Central bus station was opened in September 1969 on the corner of Franklin and Bowen Streets. It was built by Adelaide City Council in conjunction with Pioneer Tours and a consortium of nine near-country operators.

In October 1971, Terminal 2 opened for use by 16 operators including Greyhound, Premier Roadlines and Stateliner.

Over the years, there were various proposals to rebuild the bus station, including relocating it to Adelaide Parklands Terminal. In 2004, Adelaide City Council released a plan to redevelop the coach station. The new station with 39 apartments and a carpark above opened in December 2007, with the SeaLink Travel Group appointed to manage the station.

Part of the former terminal has been occupied by The Joinery, a Conservation Council of South Australia community environment space.

Operators
Adelaide Central bus station is served by:
Adelaide Sightseeing
Buses R Us
Firefly Express
Gray Line Australia
Greyhound Australia
LinkSA
NSW TrainLink
SeaLink Travel Group
Stateliner
Tambray Coaches
V/Line
Yorke Peninsula Coaches

Adelaide Metro buses also stable at the bus station.

Tesla Supercharger
In 2017, a Tesla Supercharger was installed on part of the site.

References

External links

Transport infrastructure completed in 1969
Transport in Adelaide
1969 establishments in Australia